Camp de Túria is a comarca in the province of Valencia, Valencian Community, Spain.

Geography 
It comprises the lower reaches of the river Turia and its adjacent territories. Borders with the region of Camp de Morvedre and the counties of Horta de Valencia. The south by the counties of Hoya de Buñol, west to the region of the Serranos, and north by the region of Alto Palencia.

Loriguilla is an exclave and lies between the comarcas of Los Serranos and Requena-Utiel. Whereas most of the comarca belong to the Valencian-speaking part of the Valencian community, the exclave lies in the Spanish-speaking west.

Municipalities 

Benaguasil
Benissanó
Bétera
Casinos
L'Eliana
Gátova
Llíria
Loriguilla
Marines
Náquera
Olocau de Carraixet
La Pobla de Vallbona
Riba-roja de Túria
San Antonio de Benagéber
Serra de Portaceli
Vilamarxant

 
Comarques of the Valencian Community
Geography of the Province of Valencia